Kirkville is an unincorporated community in Pike County, Mississippi, United States.

Notes

Unincorporated communities in Pike County, Mississippi
Unincorporated communities in Mississippi